The 2004–05 NBA season was the first season for the Charlotte Bobcats in the National Basketball Association. This season marked the return of NBA basketball to Charlotte after a two-year hiatus. The original Hornets had moved to New Orleans after the 2001–02 season to become the New Orleans Hornets, now the New Orleans Pelicans. The Bobcats had the second overall pick in the 2004 NBA draft, which they used to select Emeka Okafor out of the University of Connecticut. The team hired Bernie Bickerstaff as head coach during the offseason, and added veteran players like Gerald Wallace, Primož Brezec, Brevin Knight, Jason Hart, Jason Kapono, Melvin Ely and Steve Smith to their roster. The Bobcats played their first game at the Charlotte Coliseum on November 4, which was a 103–96 loss to the Washington Wizards. They would win their first game defeating the Orlando Magic 111–100 at home on November 6. However, the expansion team struggled losing ten straight games in January and March, finishing fourth in the Southeast Division with an 18–64 record. Okafor averaged 15.1 points, 10.9 rebounds, 1.7 blocks per game and was named Rookie of The Year, and selected to the NBA All-Rookie First Team.

At the time, this was reckoned as the inaugural season of the Bobcats.  However, after the 2013-14 season, the Bobcats reclaimed the Hornets name and pre-2002 history after the original Hornets team changed its name to the Pelicans.  As a result, this is now considered the 15th season of the Hornets/Bobcats franchise, the team having returned after suspending operations from 2002 to 2004.

For this season, the newly expansion team added new logo and new uniforms, added dark navy blue, grey and orange to their color scheme, added side panels to their jerseys and shorts, they remained in used until 2008.

Draft picks

Roster

Standings

Record vs. opponents

Game log

Player statistics

|- align="center" bgcolor=""
|  || 16 || 1 || 12.6 || .327 || .421 || .750 || 1.8 || 2.3 || .6 || .1 || 3.1
|- align="center" bgcolor="f0f0f0"
|  || 22 || 1 || 12.3 || .485 || . || style="background:#F26532;color:white;" | .929 || 2.1 || .3 || .2 || .5 || 5.0
|- align="center" bgcolor=""
| 
|| 74 || 42 || 24.2 || .381 || .329 || .727 || 3.1 || 1.8 || .9 || .1 || 9.6
|- align="center" bgcolor="f0f0f0"
| 
|| 72 || 72 || 31.6 || style="background:#F26532;color:white;" | .512 || . || .745 || 7.4 || 1.2 || .5 || .8 || 13.0
|- align="center" bgcolor=""
|  || 25 || 0 || 17.2 || .389 || .333 || .855 || 2.4 || .7 || .7 || .1 || 9.0
|- align="center" bgcolor="f0f0f0"
|  || 79 || 17 || 20.9 || .432 || . || .575 || 4.1 || 1.0 || .4 || .9 || 7.3
|- align="center" bgcolor=""
|  || 74 || 27 || 25.5 || .449 || .368 || .785 || 2.7 || 5.0 || 1.3 || .2 || 9.5
|- align="center" bgcolor="f0f0f0"
|  || 13 || 5 || 23.1 || .452 || .414 || .769 || 1.5 || 1.8 || 1.8 || .2 || 11.1
|- align="center" bgcolor=""
|  || style="background:#F26532;color:white;" | 81 || 14 || 18.4 || .401 || .412 || .824 || 2.0 || .8 || .5 || .1 || 8.5
|- align="center" bgcolor="f0f0f0"
| 
|| 66 || 61 || 29.5 || .422 || .150 || .852 || 2.6 || style="background:#F26532;color:white;" | 9.0 || style="background:#F26532;color:white;" | 2.0 || .1 || 10.1
|- align="center" bgcolor=""
| 
|| 73 || style="background:#F26532;color:white;" | 73 || style="background:#F26532;color:white;" | 35.6 || .447 || .000 || .609 || style="background:#F26532;color:white;" | 10.9 || .9 || .8 || style="background:#F26532;color:white;" | 1.7 || style="background:#F26532;color:white;" | 15.1
|- align="center" bgcolor="f0f0f0"
|  || 31 || 1 || 10.6 || .444 || .375 || .692 || 1.5 || 1.0 || .4 || .1 || 3.0
|- align="center" bgcolor=""
|  || 34 || 22 || 25.8 || .396 || .386 || .761 || 2.3 || 1.9 || .5 || .2 || 11.5
|- align="center" bgcolor="f0f0f0"
|  || 23 || 0 || 14.3 || .425 || . || .590 || 5.3 || .3 || .2 || .7 || 3.4
|- align="center" bgcolor=""
|  || 8 || 0 || 9.8 || .333 || .167 || .000 || 1.8 || .4 || .6 || .0 || 3.5
|- align="center" bgcolor="f0f0f0"
|  || 37 || 1 || 17.2 || .427 || style="background:#F26532;color:white;" | .422 || .870 || 1.3 || 1.5 || .3 || .2 || 7.9
|- align="center" bgcolor=""
|  || 33 || 5 || 15.5 || .324 || .250 || .875 || 3.5 || .8 || .2 || .1 || 3.2
|- align="center" bgcolor="f0f0f0"
| 
|| 70 || 68 || 30.7 || .449 || .274 || .661 || 5.5 || 2.0 || 1.7 || 1.3 || 11.1
|- align="center" bgcolor=""
|  || 17 || 0 || 7.9 || .452 || . || .350 || 2.0 || .1 || .1 || .7 || 2.5
|}

Awards and records
Rookie of the Year
 Emeka Okafor

NBA All-Rookie First Team
 Emeka Okafor

Transactions

References

Charlotte Bobcats seasons
Bob
Bob